, commonly called the Powley ruling, is a Supreme Court of Canada case defining Métis Aboriginal rights under section 35(1) of the Constitution Act, 1982.

Background
A Sault Ste. Marie father and son, Steve and Roddy Powley, were charged in 1993 with possession of a moose that they had shot out of season and without a licence. The pair pleaded not guilty on the grounds that as Métis, they had an Aboriginal right to hunt that was not subject to Ontario game laws.

Procedural history
The Ontario Court of Justice agreed and dismissed the charges. The Ontario Attorney General appealed that decision to the Ontario Superior Court of Justice, which upheld the acquittals and denied the appeal. 

The Ontario Attorney General appealed again, to the Ontario Court of Appeal, which also upheld the acquittals and denied the appeal. Finally, Ontario appealed the decision to the Supreme Court of Canada, where a unanimous court upheld the decisions of the lower courts and defined a ten-step test for Métis rights, based on modified tests from the previous Indian Aboriginal rights decisions in R. v. Sparrow and R. v. Van der Peet.

Aftermath
Métis people seeking to exercise Aboriginal rights of hunting and fishing must show that the practice in question relates to the practice of a rights-bearing Métis community prior to European political and legal control and that they are members of the corresponding modern Métis community by both self-identification and acceptance within the community.

Thus, if a Métis group of people established a rights-bearing community distinct from any Indian or Inuit Aboriginal groups from which it had descended, practices that the community exercised prior to European control may be Section 35(1) rights.

See also
The Canadian Crown and First Nations, Inuit and Métis
 Canadian Aboriginal case law
Numbered Treaties
Indian Act
Section Thirty-five of the Constitution Act, 1982
Indian Health Transfer Policy (Canada)

References

Indigenous rights in Canada
Canadian Aboriginal case law
Métis in Canada
2003 in Canadian case law
Métis in Ontario